The Dognapper is a 2013 Brazilian comedy film directed by Pedro Amorim, his directorial debut, and starring Bruno Gagliasso, Leandra Leal and Danilo Gentili.

The film was released in Brazil on October 4, 2013, the National Dog Day and World Animal Day.

Plot 
Deco (Bruno Gagliasso) and Zoé (Leandra Leal) fall in love after saving a puppy with narcolepsy. The relationship ends two years later and Zoe takes the couple's dog with her. For the first time, Deco has to take a stand, and retrieve his dog.

Cast 

 Bruno Gagliasso as Deco
 Leandra Leal as Zoé
 Danilo Gentili as Leléo
 Letícia Isnard as Ananda
 Enrique Diaz as Fernando 
 Felipe Rocha as Sidney
 Gabriela Duarte as Mariana
 Simone Mazzer	as Rita
 Rafinha Bastos as Vet

Music 

No Surprises - Radiohead
I Love Rock 'n' Roll - Joan Jett & The Blackhearts
We Will Rock You - Queen
Meu Sangue Ferve Por Você - Sidney Magal
Alagados - Os Paralamas do Sucesso
The Underdog - Spoon
Us Mano E As Mina - Xis
Fogo e Paixão - Wando
Kátia Flávia - Fausto Fawcett
Eu Não Sou Cachorro Não - Waldick Soriano

References

External links
  
 

2013 films
Brazilian romantic comedy films
Films about dogs
Films shot in Rio de Janeiro (city)
Films set in Rio de Janeiro (city)
2013 directorial debut films
2013 romantic comedy films
2010s Portuguese-language films